Anamir Asfal is a sub-district located in Al Mashannah District, Ibb Governorate, Yemen. Anamir Asfal  had a population of  8820 as of 2004.

References 

Sub-districts in Al Mashannah District